Sunken Garden United Football Club is an association football based club in the Philippines. It was founded in 1997 based on the home field of the club, which is called Sunken Garden located inside the University of the Philippines main campus in Diliman, Quezon City. It played in the United Football League's Division 2.

The club participates in a public and private partnership to create the World Cup Pilipinas, which is a month-long annual football tournament beginning in late May.

The club is registered with the Philippine Securities and Exchange Commission as an athletic organization.

References

Football clubs in the Philippines
Association football clubs established in 1997
1997 establishments in the Philippines
Sports teams in Metro Manila